Niue competed at the 2019 Pacific Games in Apia, Samoa from 7 to 20 July 2019. The country participated in eight sports at the 2019 games.

Boxing

Golf

Niue qualified eight players for the 2019 tournament:

Men
 Dustin Pulu
 Waimanu Pulu
 Toma Vakanidua
 Masiniholo Lagaloga

Women
 Coral Pasisi
 Micah Fuhiniu
 Haven Siosikefu
 Margaret Siosikefu

Lawn bowls

Netball

Powerlifting

Rugby league nines

Niue named fifteen players in their women's rugby league nines team for the 2019 games.

 Danielle Apain
 Katelyn Arona
 Santoria Faaofo
 Ana Hiku
 Morgan Ikihele
 Mary Makai
 Taimani Marshall
 Marina Misimake
 Kathleen Noble
 Jamie Patuki
 Shanice Rex
 Zion Seini
 Natalee Tagavaitau
 Litahina Tuialii
 Ikivaka-Malu Vilitam

Shooting

Weightlifting

References

Nations at the 2019 Pacific Games
2019